Franco Chiavarini (born 18 February 1980) is an Argentine footballer

Career
He has spent the majority of his career playing in the lower divisions of Italian football.

In 2007, he joined Bellaria–Igea along with Juanito. In June 2008 he was acquired by A.C. Cesena in co-ownership deal for €275,000 and co-currently Triestina acquired Cristian Cristea for €225,000. Chiavarini only played for Cesena in 2008–09 Lega Pro Prima Divisione. He did not play in 2009–10 Serie B nor 2010–11 Serie A.

He was loaned out to NK Zagreb in January 2011.

On 22 August 2011 he was signed by South Tyrol in another temporary deal.

In December 2012 he returned to Argentina for Atlético Paraná on trial.

References

External links
 Chiavarini at BDFA.
 Player Profile from tuttocalciatori.it
 Player Profile from legaseriea.it

1980 births
Living people
Argentine footballers
Argentine expatriate footballers
A.C. Carpi players
U.S. Viterbese 1908 players
A.C. Bellaria Igea Marina players
A.C. Cesena players
A.S.D. Sangiovannese 1927 players
NK Zagreb players
Croatian Football League players
Expatriate footballers in Italy
Expatriate footballers in Croatia
Association football forwards
Footballers from Santa Fe, Argentina